Ding Jiaxi is a Chinese civil rights activist known for co-organizing the New Citizens' Movement advocating for political change in China. Ding was one of five dissidents detained after a secret meeting in Fujian and is currently awaiting trial.

See also
Xu Zhiyong
Weiquan movement
New Citizens' Movement (China)

References  

Living people
Chinese human rights activists
Chinese dissidents
Weiquan movement
Chinese prisoners and detainees
Prisoners and detainees of the People's Republic of China
Year of birth missing (living people)